The 1904 East Florida Seminary football team represented the East Florida Seminary in the sport of American football during the 1904 college football season. Though the school was located in Gainesville, Florida, it was not the modern University of Florida but one of its predecessor institutions. Intercollegiate football was not as a well-established sport in Florida at the time, so seasons typically consisted of a few games against in-state schools or athletic clubs. East Florida Seminary's team played three games in 1904 - home-and-home losses against the Stetson Hatters along with a road victory over the Cadets of the South Florida Military Institute in what may have been the first organized football game played in Polk County.

The 1904-1905 academic year was the last for the school. The Florida legislature reorganized the state's system of higher education the following year, and the East Florida Seminary was consolidated along with four other state-supported institutions to form the new "University of the State of Florida", which established its own football program in 1906.

Schedule

References

East Florida Seminary
East Florida Seminary football seasons
East Florida Seminary football